Kamenica nad Hronom is a municipality and village in the Nové Zámky District in the Nitra Region of south-west Slovakia.

Geography
The village lies at an altitude of 117 metres and covers an area of 18.795 km².

History
In historical records the village was first mentioned in 1156.
After the Austro-Hungarian army disintegrated in November 1918, Czechoslovak troops occupied the area, later acknowledged internationally by the Treaty of Trianon. Between 1938and 1945 Kamenica nad Hronom once more  became part of Miklós Horthy's Hungary through the First Vienna Award. From 1945 until the Velvet Divorce, it was part of Czechoslovakia. Since then it has been part of Slovakia.

Population
It has a population of about 1315 people. The ethnic composition of the population is approximately 80% Hungarian and 20% Slovak.

Facilities
The village has a public library and a football pitch.

Genealogical resources

The records for genealogical research are available at the state archive "Statny Archiv in Nitra, Slovakia"

 Roman Catholic church records (births/marriages/deaths): 1724–1895 (parish A)
 Lutheran church records (births/marriages/deaths): 1793–1895 (parish B)
 Reformated church records (births/marriages/deaths): 1833–1895 (parish B)

See also
 List of municipalities and towns in Slovakia

References

External links
https://web.archive.org/web/20070513023228/http://www.statistics.sk/mosmis/eng/run.html
Kamenica nad Hronom – Nové Zámky Okolie
Surnames of living people in Kamenica nad Hronom

Villages and municipalities in Nové Zámky District